Isocetus is an extinct genus of baleen whale belonging to the clade Thalassotherii. Remains have been found in middle Miocene marine deposits in Belgium.

Description
Isocetus was considered a nomen dubium by Steeman (2010) but was treated as a distinct species by Bisconti et al. (2013) based on characters of the mandibular condyle and dentary. A complete thalassothere specimen from Belgium previously assigned to Isocetus depauwi by Abel (1938) is now the holotype of the species Parietobalaena campiniana.

References

Prehistoric cetacean genera
Fossil taxa described in 1880
Neogene mammals of Europe